The 1965 Houston Astros season was the franchise's first season in the Houston Astrodome, as well as its first season as the Astros after three seasons known as the Colt .45s. It involved the Houston Astros finishing in ninth place in the National League with a record of 65–97, 32 games behind the eventual World Series champion Los Angeles Dodgers. The Astros were managed by Lum Harris.

Offseason 
On December 1, The Houston club changed its nickname from Colt .45s to Astros. The move resulted from objections by the Colt Firearms Company to the club's sales of novelties bearing the old nickname. Despite the trademark issues, the "Astros" nickname matched the futuristic ambiance of the revolutionary domed stadium. The nickname was also appropriate since Houston was, by then, the home of NASA's astronaut program. The scoreboard retained subliminal references to the old nickname, as it featured electronically animated cowboys firing pistols, with the "bullets" ricocheting around the scoreboard, when an Astros player would hit a home run. Early on, the groundskeepers also wore astronaut spacesuits to promote that futuristic image.

Astrodome 
On April 9, the former Houston Colt .45s took the field and officially became the Houston Astros. They inaugurated indoor baseball in the Astrodome with a 2–1 exhibition win over the New York Yankees.

The stadium was designed as a defense against the oppressive heat and humidity of the Houston summer. Loosely based on the old Roman Colosseum, the Astrodome was dubbed the Eighth Wonder of the World. As with many stadiums of that era, such as RFK Stadium and Shea Stadium, the Astrodome was a multi-purpose stadium, designed for both football as well as baseball.

Besides its roof, the Astrodome was revolutionary for a number of other reasons. It was one of the first stadiums to have individual, theatre-type seats for every seat in the venue. Additionally, it was one of the first stadiums to have luxury seats and club seating, at the time a relatively new concept in sports venues. It also had an "exploding scoreboard", which would show various animations after a home run or a win, as well as messages and advertising.

Notable transactions 
 January 31, 1965: Bob Watson was signed as an amateur free agent by the Astros.

Regular season 
Rookie Joe Morgan set club marks for at-bats, runs, hits and triples.

Season standings

Record vs. opponents

Opening Day starters 
 Bob Aspromonte
 John Bateman
 Jim Beauchamp
 Walt Bond
 Bob Bruce
 Joe Gaines
 Bob Lillis
 Joe Morgan
 Jimmy Wynn

Notable transactions 
 April 24, 1965: Don Larsen was traded by the Astros to the Baltimore Orioles for Bob Saverine and cash.
 May 23, 1965: Ken Johnson and Jim Beauchamp were traded by the Astros to the Milwaukee Braves for Lee Maye.
 June 14, 1965: Gus Triandos was purchased by the Astros from the Philadelphia Phillies.
 July 10, 1965: Frank Thomas was purchased by the Astros from the Philadelphia Phillies.
 August 20, 1965: Gus Triandos was released by the Astros.
 September 1, 1965: Frank Thomas was traded by the Astros to the Milwaukee Braves for a player to be named later. The Braves completed the deal by sending Mickey Sinnerud (minors) to the Astros on September 11.

Roster

Player stats

Batting

Starters by position 
Note: Pos = Position; G = Games played; AB = At bats; R = Runs scored; H = Hits; 2B = Doubles; 3B = Triples; Avg. = Batting average; HR = Home runs; RBI = Runs batted in; SB = Stolen basesPositional abbreviations: C = Catcher; 1B = First base; 2B = Second base; 3B = Third base; SS = Shortstop; LF = Left field; CF = Center field; RF = Right field

Other batters 
Note: G = Games played; AB = At bats; R = Runs scored; H = Hits; 2B = Doubles; 3B = Triples; Avg. = Batting average; HR = Home runs; RBI = Runs batted in; SB = Stolen bases

Pitching

Starting pitchers 
Note: G = Games pitched; GS = Games started; IP = Innings pitched; W = Wins; L = Losses; ERA = Earned run average; R = Runs allowed; ER = Earned runs allowed; BB = Walks allowed; K = Strikeouts

Other pitchers 
Note: G = Games pitched; GS = Games started; IP = Innings pitched; W = Wins; L = Losses; SV = Saves; ERA = Earned run average; R = Runs allowed; ER = Earned runs allowed; BB = Walks allowed; K = Strikeouts

Relief pitchers 
Note: G = Games pitched; IP = Innings pitched; W = Wins; L = Losses; SV = Saves; ERA = Earned run average; R = Runs allowed; ER = Earned runs allowed; BB = Walks allowed; K = Strikeouts

Awards and honors 

All-Star Game
 Turk Farrell

Farm system 

LEAGUE CHAMPIONS: Oklahoma City, FRL Astros

References

External links
1965 Houston Astros season at Baseball Reference
1965 Houston Astros at Baseball Almanac

Houston Astros seasons
Houston Astros season
Houston Astro